HMS Defender was an Acheron-class destroyer which was built in 1911, served throughout World War I and was broken up in 1921. She was the fifth ship of the name to serve in the Royal Navy.

Construction
Defender was laid down at William Denny & Brothers in Dumbarton, Scotland on 7 November 1910, launched on 30 August 1911 and completed in January 1912. Her total cost was £83,000.

Operational history

Pre-World War One
Defender and her sisters formed the First Destroyer Flotilla and were attached to the Grand Fleet in 1914.

Battle of Heligoland Bight
On 28 August 1914 the Royal Navy and the Imperial German Navy met at the Battle of Heligoland Bight.  When the German Destroyer V-187 was hit by eight British destroyers and sank with heavy loss of life, Defender stopped to pick up survivors. The reappearance of the German cruiser SMS Stettin caused two of her boats to be left behind. Their crews were lucky to be rescued by the British submarine E4. Short of space, the captain of E4 embarked three German prisoners and supplied the boats with water, biscuits, a compass, and a course to steer, and they returned safely to base.

On 23 November 1914, the British battleships  and  bombarded the German-occupied Belgian port of Zeebrugge, which was being used as a base for German submarines. Defender was one of eight destroyers detached from the Harwich Force to reinforce the escort for the operation, joining six destroyers of the Dover Patrol and four French destroyers. The operation was unchallenged by the German defences, but little damage was done to the port.

Battle of Dogger Bank
Defender was present at the Battle of Dogger Bank on 24 January 1915 with the First Destroyer Flotilla, led by the light cruiser Aurora.

Battle of Jutland

On the night of 31 May - 1 June 1916 Defender took an active part in the Battle of Jutland, with the First Destroyer Flotilla operating in support of Beatty's battlecruiser force. At about 18:30 she was struck in the forward boiler room by a single 12 inch (305 mm) shell, killing one man and wounding two. On restoring power (about 19:15) she took the damaged Onslow in tow and made Aberdeen the next day. Her captain, Lieutenant Commander L R Palmer received the Distinguished Service Order. The event was described in detail by Rudyard Kipling, in Sea Warfare under the heading Towing Under Difficulties. The report on the battle by Admiral Beatty stated that:

Lieutenant Commander Palmer wrote after the battle that Onslow had signalled Defender with the following message:

She was transferred to the 3rd Battle Squadron in 1916 and survived the war.

Disposal

Defender was laid up and sold to Rees of Llanelly for breaking up on 4 November 1921.

Pennant numbers

References

External links 
 
 Battle of Jutland Crew Lists Project - HMS Defender Crew List

 

Acheron-class destroyers of the Royal Navy
Ships built on the River Clyde
1911 ships
World War I destroyers of the United Kingdom